Hypoleucis ophiusa, the common costus skipper, is a species of butterfly in the family Hesperiidae. It is found in Senegal, Guinea, Sierra Leone, Liberia, Ivory Coast, Ghana, Togo, Cameroon, Gabon, the Republic of the Congo, the Democratic Republic of the Congo, Uganda, Tanzania and Zambia. The habitat consists of forests.

Adults are attracted to flowers, especially those of Costus species and gingers. Adult males are also attracted to bird droppings.

The larvae feed on Costus species, including Costus afer. They live in shelters constructed of rolled leaves and eat three-quarters of the leaf of their host plant before leaving the shelter. Pupation takes place at the base of the leaf.

Subspecies
Hypoleucis ophiusa ophiusa (Senegal, to Cameroon, Gabon, Congo, Democratic Republic of the Congo: Mayoumbe)
Hypoleucis ophiusa ophir Evans, 1937 (Democratic Republic of the Congo: excluding the Mayoumbe area, Uganda, western Tanzania, Zambia)

References

Butterflies described in 1866
Hesperiinae
Butterflies of Africa
Taxa named by William Chapman Hewitson